Prodida is a genus of ground spiders that was first described by R. de Dalmas in 1919.  it contains only two species, found only on the Seychelles and in the Philippines: P. longiventris and P. stella.

See also
 List of Gnaphosidae species

References

Araneomorphae genera
Gnaphosidae
Spiders of Africa
Spiders of Asia